Normalization or normalisation refers to a process that makes something more normal or regular. Most commonly it refers to:

 Normalization (sociology) or social normalization, the process through which ideas and behaviors that may fall outside of social norms come to be regarded as "normal"

Normalization or normalisation may also refer to:

Science 
 Normalization process theory, a sociological theory of the implementation of new technologies or innovations
 Normalization model, used in visual neuroscience
 Normalization in quantum mechanics: see

Mathematics and statistics
 Normalization of an algebraic variety, the operation consisting in taking locally the integral closure of the ring of regular functions
 Normalization (statistics), adjustments of values or distributions in statistics
 Quantile normalization, statistical technique for making two distributions identical in statistical properties
 Normalizing (abstract rewriting), an abstract rewriting system in which every object has at least one normal form
 Normalization property (abstract rewriting), a property of a rewrite system in mathematical logic and theoretical computer science
 Normalizing constant, in probability theory a constant to make a non-negative function a probability density function
 Noether normalization lemma, result of commutative algebra
 The process of obtaining a normalized vector
 Normalized number, adjusting a floating point number's exponent so that the decimal point is in a fixed position

Technology and computer science 
 A metallurgic process used in annealing
 Normalization (image processing), changing the range of pixel intensity values
 Audio normalization, process of uniformly increasing or decreasing the amplitude of an audio signal
 Data normalization, general reduction of data to canonical form
 Database normalization, used in database theory
 NFD normalization, normalization form decomposition for Unicode string searches and comparisons in text processing
 Spatial normalization, a step in image processing for neuroimaging
 Text normalization, modifying text to make it consistent
 URL normalization, process to modify URLs in a consistent manner
 Normalized frequency (digital signal processing), unit of frequency cycles/sample in digital signal processing

Other 
 The process of establishing normal diplomatic relations between two countries
 Normalization (people with disabilities), principle to make conditions of everyday living available to people with disabilities
 Normalization (Czechoslovakia), the restoration of the conditions prevalent before the reform in Czechoslovakia, 1969

See also
 Normalized frequency (disambiguation)
 Normal form (disambiguation)
 Normal (disambiguation)